Nebulosa erymas is a moth of the family Notodontidae first described by Herbert Druce in 1885. It is found in Panama and Costa Rica.

The larvae feed on Cestrum megalophyllum and Perrottetia longistylis. They have bright yellow stripes and conspicuous pairs of black, subdorsal spots on the thorax.

References

Moths described in 1885
Notodontidae